Tristan Sailor (born 23 June 1998) is an Australian professional rugby league footballer who plays as a  and  for the Souths Logan Magpies in the Queensland Cup. He previously played for the St. George Illawarra Dragons in the National Rugby League.

Background
Sailor was born in Brisbane into a family of Torres Strait Islander descent. His father, Wendell, was a dual international who played more than 300 combined professional games across the two codes of rugby. At the age of seven, Sailor moved to Sydney with his family before settling in Wollongong two years later and began playing junior rugby league for the Western Suburbs Red Devils in the Illawarra Rugby League. Despite spending the majority of his upbringing in New South Wales, Sailor's State of Origin eligibility for Queensland was confirmed in 2014 when the NRL introduced a father-son rule. Sailor confirmed later in 2014 that he had always wanted to represent Queensland.

Career
Sailor made his first grade debut in round 23 of the 2019 NRL season for St George against the Sydney Roosters scoring a try in a 34-12 loss at Kogarah Oval.

On 29 September 2019, Sailor was named in the 2019 Canterbury Cup NSW team of the season.

He was released by St. George Illawarra at the end of the 2020 NRL season.

After being released by the club, Sailor's father Wendell Sailor spoke to the media and voiced his anger at his son being released, saying he was told by the club that if he had a big off-season, he would be in the mix this year but he never got any game time.”

In April 2022, Souths Logan Magpies in the Queensland Cup competition announced they had signed Sailor for the rest of the season.
On 16 December 2022, it was announced that Sailor had joined Brisbane on a train and trial contract ahead of the 2023 NRL season.

Controversy
On 10 October 2020, Sailor was arrested and charged with aggravated sexual assault against a woman in a house in Sydney.
On 31 March 2022, Sailor was found not guilty on all charges.

References

External links
Dragons profile

1998 births
Australian rugby league players
Indigenous Australian rugby league players
St. George Illawarra Dragons players
Rugby league five-eighths
Rugby league fullbacks
Living people